Monty Python Live at Drury Lane is a live album released by Monty Python in 1974. It was recorded on the final night of their four-week run at the Drury Lane Theatre in London earlier that year and edited onto disc with new studio linking material by Eric Idle and Michael Palin. The majority of the sketches are from Flying Circus and vary slightly from their television counterparts, although "Cocktail Bar" was written for the third series but not used. The team also revived sketches from At Last The 1948 Show, including "Secret Service", "Wrestling" and "Four Yorkshiremen" - the latter on its way to being adopted as a Python standard. Neil Innes provided the musical interludes, while Eric Idle's then wife Lyn Ashley replaced regular Python actress Carol Cleveland in supporting roles.

As with its predecessor, the second side of the original UK vinyl release had a cryptic message by George Peckham etched onto the runout groove, which read "THE WONDERFUL WORLD OF PORKY TRISHY MELLY YEAH". This message was missing from the second pressings, the label of which added the musical titles used on the album (notably for the many songs referenced in "Election Special").

To promote the album's release, a double-sided 33rpm Flexi disc was issued free with the 25 May 1974 edition of New Musical Express entitled Monty Python's Tiny Black Round Thing which contained an extended version of "Election Special" and "Lumberjack Song" with new linking material from Michael Palin.

The album was the group's most successful to date, reaching No. 19 in the UK Albums Chart.

The album was released in Canada in 1975 (distributed by GRT of Canada Ltd. 9211-4) but was not issued in the US until 1994, when it was included in the box set The Instant Monty Python CD Collection. Until then, the only live Python album released in the US had been Monty Python Live at City Center, released in 1976.

The album's cover was designed by Terry Gilliam's assistant Katy Hepburn (misspelled as "Hebbern" on the back cover). Three decades later, it made a surprise appearance in Gilliam's 2005 film Tideland, where it can be seen at the front of a box of LPs.

The performance featured Eric Idle muttering "Breakaway!" during the "Nudge, Nudge" sketch (Idle was advertising the Breakaway chocolate bar at this time), which resulted in an unexpectedly strong laugh from the audience. This moment was removed from subsequent compilations.

Although originally released in stereo, the 2006 special edition CD has the whole album mixed into mono. This is the only one of the 2006 reissues to contain no new material, with the exception of an interview placed at the end of the disc.

Track listing

Side one
 Introduction
 Llamas
 Gumby - Flower Arranging
 Secret Service
 Wrestling
 Communist Quiz
 Idiot Song
 Albatross
 Colonel
 Nudge, Nudge
 Cocktail Bar
 Travel Agent

Side two
 Spot the Brain Cell
  Bruces
  Argument 
  I've Got Two Legs
  Four Yorkshiremen
  Election Special
  Lumberjack Song
  Parrot Sketch

An interview is added to the 2006 special edition

Personnel 
 Graham Chapman
 John Cleese
 Terry Gilliam
 Eric Idle
 Terry Jones
 Michael Palin

Additional performers 
 Lyn Ashley
 Neil Innes

Music credits
The following is the list of musical works included on the album. They comprise a mixture of Studio G, Keith Prowse and De Wolfe library music, self-penned Python and Neil Innes songs and short extracts of famous songs referenced in "Election Special".

 Granada (Dorothy Dodd & Agustin Lara)
 Happy Movement (J. Harpham)
 World In Action (K. Mansfield)
 Idiot Song (Neil Innes)
 Comic Giggles (J. Pearson)
 Bruces Song (Eric Idle)
 I've Got Two Legs (Terry Gilliam)
 Prestige Theme (K. Mansfield)
 We'll Keep a Welcome (Mai Jones, Lyn Joshua & James Harper)
 Raindrops Keep Falling On My Head (Burt Bacharach & Hal David)
 Don't Sleep In The Subway (Tony Hatch & Jackie Trent)
 Climb Every Mountain (Richard Rodgers & Oscar Hammerstein II)
 Lumberjack Song (Michael Palin, Terry Jones & Fred Tomlinson)
 Liberty Bell (John Philip Sousa, arr. Sheriff)

References

Monty Python live albums
1974 live albums
Live albums recorded at the Theatre Royal, Drury Lane
Charisma Records live albums